Introducing Joss Stone (stylised as Introducing... Joss Stone) is the third studio album by English singer and songwriter Joss Stone, released on 9 March 2007 by Virgin Records. Stone began writing the album in April 2006 in Barbados, before meeting up with producer Raphael Saadiq in the Bahamas to record the songs. Introducing Joss Stone also features guest vocal appearances by rapper Common and singer Lauryn Hill.

Upon its release, the album was met with generally positive reviews from music critics. Introducing Joss Stone was not as commercially successful as Stone's previous albums in her native United Kingdom, peaking at number 12 on the UK Albums Chart and selling 27,000 copies in its first week. In the United States, it debuted at number two on the Billboard 200 with first-week sales of 118,000 units, yielding the second highest debut for a British female solo artist on the chart. It also performed well across continental Europe, charting inside the top 10 in several countries. The album has sold 1.3 million copies worldwide.

Background and recording

Chris Anokute was hired by Virgin Records chairman Jason Flom to A&R Introducing Joss Stone with a budget of $1 million, which Anokute described to HitQuarters as his "first real A&R job". In April 2006, Flom sent Stone to Barbados with Anokute for two months, where she began writing the lyrics and he helped her develop the songs. Stone wrote an estimated 60 songs. In collaboration with Stone's manager Marty Maidenberg and Merck Mercuriadis, Anokute developed the vision for the album, enlisting producers and musicians such as Raphael Saadiq, Novel, Dallas Austin and Common. Anokute also arranged a duet with Lauryn Hill, who had not guested on anyone else's record since her debut album, The Miseducation of Lauryn Hill (1998).

After spending months in Barbados, Stone travelled to Nassau, Bahamas, to meet up with Saadiq, who produced the entire album. "Raphael is the most incredible musician I've ever met in my whole life", Stone said. "Musically, I feel like he reads my mind. I'll give him a look and he'll know exactly what I want." The two spent two months in Nassau recording at Compass Point Studios, followed by the album's mixing at Electric Lady Studios in New York City.

Release and promotion

On 13 March 2007, VH1 launched a music series titled Album Autopsy: Introducing Joss Stone on its broadband video channel VSPOT. The series took an in-depth look at the entire album process, including Stone's songwriting process, recording sessions, creation of the album cover art and interviews with Stone and people involved in the album's production. The deluxe edition of the album includes a bonus DVD containing behind-the-scenes footage, interviews with Stone and the music video for "Tell Me 'bout It".

From March to June 2007, Stone performed on several American television shows to promote the album, including Late Show with David Letterman, Tavis Smiley, Today, The Early Show, The Late Late Show with Craig Ferguson, The Tonight Show with Jay Leno, Dancing with the Stars, The Ellen DeGeneres Show and Live! with Kelly and Michael. According to Stone, her record label cancelled all her then-upcoming press appearances to promote the album in the United Kingdom, as a result of the backlash that her appearance at the 2007 Brit Awards received from the British media.

Stone toured North America in support of the album from 27 April to 13 June 2007, visiting 16 cities in total, including Philadelphia, New Orleans, San Francisco, Vancouver, Seattle, Chicago, Toronto, Montreal, New York City and Boston. Two months later, Stone embarked on a North American late-summer tour, which ran from 27 August to 29 September 2007 and covered 12 cities: Los Angeles; Park City, Utah; Snowmass Village, Colorado; Seattle; Jacksonville, Oregon; Las Vegas; Mexico City; Austin, Texas; Biloxi, Mississippi; Chicago; San Francisco; and Kansas City, Missouri.

Singles
"Tell Me 'bout It" was released on 5 March 2007 as the lead single from Introducing Joss Stone. The song peaked at number 28 on the UK Singles Chart, and became Stone's first solo single to chart on the US Billboard Hot 100, reaching number 83. The album's second single, "Tell Me What We're Gonna Do Now", features rapper Common and was released on 23 July 2007, peaking at number 84 on the UK Singles Chart.

Despite not being released as a single, "Bruised but Not Broken" was sent to urban adult contemporary radio in the United States on 17 July 2007, allowing the song to reach number 55 on the Hot R&B/Hip-Hop Songs chart and number 13 on the Hot Adult R&B Airplay chart. It was ultimately ranked number 38 on Radio & Recordss urban AC year-end chart of 2007 with 9,049 plays. "Baby Baby Baby" was released on 23 December 2007 as the album's third and final single. The song reached number eight on the UK R&B Singles Chart, but failed to chart on any other major charts.

Critical reception

Introducing Joss Stone received generally positive reviews from music critics. At Metacritic, which assigns a normalised rating out of 100 to reviews from mainstream publications, the album received an average score of 64, based on 22 reviews. Rolling Stones Christian Hoard felt that "[t]here are a couple of moments on Stone's third album when she clobbers a melody with enough showy vocal oomph to make even Christina Aguilera fans squirm. But for the most part, Stone employs her remarkable instrument with focus and nuance on Introducing, and the result is an album full of solid pop-wise R&B." Mike Joseph of PopMatters commented that "[i]t's certainly the first great R&B album I've heard this year. While there's still the occasional affectation that I wish she would get rid of, Stone has grown into her music quite a bit."

Tim Perlich of Canadian newspaper Now noted, "With the fast-maturing Stone gaining greater control of her powerful pipes and a recent breakup adding to the underlying sexual tension while stoking the creative fire, the craftily reconstituted 70s R&B concept works exceptionally well." Blender critic David Browne wrote, "Nearly every song is a souped-up retro-funk tornado, pushed along by blaxploitation-soundtrack guitars, scenery-chewing backup singers and, of course, Stone's husky pipes." Both Billboard and Entertainment Weekly praised Saadiq's production; the former called it "brimming with horns and seriously in-the-pocket rhythm sections, but there are also enough hip-hop touches and contemporary arrangements to keep the tracks in the now", while the latter opined that "[h]e brings a strong focus to Introducing Joss Stone, blending the digital crispness of modern R&B with Stone's preferred flavors of retro: swooping Motown-style strings, girl-group background vocals, gutbucket soul guitar." In a review for AllMusic, Stephen Thomas Erlewine found that "Introducing does sound brighter, fresher than her other two albums, pitched partway between Amy Winehouse and Back to Basics Christina yet sounding very much like Texas at their prime, but it's all surface change."

Commercial performance
Introducing Joss Stone debuted at number 12 on the UK Albums Chart, selling 27,000 copies in its first week. The album was certified silver by the British Phonographic Industry (BPI) on 22 July 2013, denoting shipments in excess of 60,000 copies. The album debuted on the US Billboard 200 at number two with first-week sales of over 118,000 copies, becoming Stone's highest-peaking album in the United States to date and the highest-charting debut for a British female solo artist on the Billboard 200 in the Nielsen SoundScan era, beating the record previously held by Amy Winehouse, whose album Back to Black had debuted at number seven the week before. This record was eventually broken by Leona Lewis's Spirit, which debuted at number one on the Billboard 200 in April 2008. The Recording Industry Association of America (RIAA) certified the album gold on 1 May 2007, within two months of release. As of July 2011, it had sold 652,000 copies in the US.

The album debuted at number six on the Canadian Albums Chart and at number one on the R&B albums chart. It was certified gold by the Canadian Recording Industry Association (CRIA) on 11 April 2007 for sales in excess of 50,000 copies. In mainland Europe, Introducing Joss Stone peaked at number one in the Netherlands, and charted within the top five in Belgium and Switzerland, and the top 10 in Austria, Germany, Italy and Portugal. It was less successful in Nordic countries, peaking at number 27 in Norway, number 31 in Sweden and number 38 in Denmark, while failing to chart at all in Finland. Across Oceania, the album charted at number 15 in Australia and at number 17 in New Zealand. In March 2007, EMI reported that Introducing Joss Stone had sold 1.3 million copies worldwide.

Track listing

Notes
 "Music (Outro)" ends at 1:40, followed by silence until 3:10, when a hidden track consisting of a short song performed by Stone and Vinnie Jones begins.

Sample credits
 "Headturner" contains an interpolation of "Respect" by Otis Redding.
 "Music" contains an interpolation of "The Mask" by the Fugees.
 "Proper Nice" contains an interpolation of "Catch Me (I'm Falling)" by Pretty Poison.

Personnel
Credits adapted from the liner notes of Introducing Joss Stone.

Musicians

 Joss Stone – lead vocals
 Vinnie Jones – voiceover 
 Joi Gilliam – background vocals 
 Keisha Jackson – background vocals 
 Jermaine Paul – background vocals 
 Raphael Saadiq – bass ; guitar ; background vocals ; horn arrangements ; keyboards ; piano 
 Khari Parker – drums ; percussion ; additional drums 
 Robert Ozuna – additional drums ; percussion ; sitar ; drums ; turntablism 
 Chalmers "Spanky" Alford – guitar 
 Lionel Holoman – organ ; Rhodes ; keyboards ; Wurlitzer 
 Benjamin Wright – string arrangements ; horn arrangements 
 Anthony Coleman – trumpet 
 Kenneth "Scooter" Whalum III – tenor saxophone ; baritone saxophone 
 James Zeller – trombone 
 Neil Symonette – percussion 
 Common – vocals 
 Charlie Happiness – clav 
 Mix Master Mike – turntablism 
 Lauryn Hill – vocals 
 Priscilla Jones Campbell – background vocals 
 Tino Richardson – saxophone 
 Jawara Adams – trumpet 
 Lois Colin – harp

The Benjamin Wright Orchestra

 Benjamin Wright – conducting
 Stephen Baxter – horn
 Duane Benjamin – horn
 Ron Brown – horn
 Jeffrey Clayton – horn
 Anthony Coleman – horn
 Salvator Cracciolo – horn
 James Ford III – horn
 Matthew Frank – horn
 Lionel Holoman – horn
 Kenneth "Scooter" Whalum III – horn
 James Zeller – horn
 Mark Cargill – concertmaster, violin
 Sanford Allen – violin
 Richard Adkins – violin
 Sandra Billingslea – violin
 Charlie Bisharat – violin
 Susan Chatman – violin
 Robert Chausow – violin
 Cenovia Cummins – violin
 Yvette Devereaux – violin
 Gayle Dixon – violin
 Barry Finclair – violin
 Pamela Gates – violin
 Stanley Hunte – violin
 Marisa McLeod – violin
 Lori Miller – violin
 Cameron Patrick – violin
 Kathleen Robertson – violin
 Lesa Terry – violin
 Alexander Vselensky – violin
 Belinda Whitney – violin
 Miguel Atwood-Ferguson – viola
 Richard Brice – viola
 Christopher Jenkins – viola
 Jorge Moraga – viola
 Patrick Morgan – viola
 Robin Ross – viola
 Orlando Wells – viola
 Lisa Whitfield – viola
 Peggy Baldwin – cello
 Giovanna Clayton – cello
 Ernest Ehrhardt Jr. – cello
 Eileen Folson – cello
 Erik Friedlander – cello
 Ronald Lipscomb – cello
 Miguel Martinez – cello
 Frederick Zlotkin – cello
 Ida Bodin – bass
 Joseph Bongiorno – bass
 Kevin Brandon – bass
 Leon Maleson – bass

Technical

 Raphael Saadiq – production
 Joss Stone – executive production
 Chuck Brungardt – recording, mixing ; Pro Tools 
 Glenn Standridge – recording, mixing, production coordinator
 Marlon Marcel – engineering assistance 
 Steve Greenwell – additional recording ; vocal recording 
 Oswald Bowe – engineering assistance 
 Reggie Dozier – strings recording ; horn recording 
 John Tanksley – engineering assistance 
 James Tanksley – engineering assistance 
 Jeremy Mackenzie – Pro Tools 
 Ian Shea – engineering assistance 
 Dror Mohar – engineering assistance 
 Isaiah Abolin – engineering assistance 
 Seamus Tyson – engineering assistance 
 Scott Somerville – engineering assistance 
 Charlie Stavish – engineering assistance 
 Mike Boden – engineering assistance 
 Dave Larring – additional recording 
 Luke Smith – engineering assistance 
 Justin Kessler – Pro Tools 
 Tom Coyne – mastering at Sterling Sound (New York City)

Artwork
 Joss Stone – art direction
 Sean Mosher-Smith – art direction
 David Gorman – design
 Kate McGregor – art coordination
 Brian Bowen Smith – photography
 Bob Scott – sidebar and peace sign photography
 Jonathan "Meres" Cohen – body painting, graffiti
 Joshua Lutz – mural

Charts

Weekly charts

Year-end charts

Certifications

Release history

Notes

References

2007 albums
Albums produced by Raphael Saadiq
Albums recorded at Electric Lady Studios
Hip hop albums by English artists
Joss Stone albums
Pop-rap albums
Virgin Records albums